Farai Tumbare (born 6 July 1978) is a Zimbabwean former basketball player. Nicknamed The Tombstone, he was a member of the Zimbabwean men's national basketball team.

Early life
Tumbare comes from the high density suburb of Tafara in Harare, Zimbabwe, was a primary and high school captain and an excellent academic and sportsperson.

Club career 
He was a member of the Cameo outfit coached by Roderick Takawira that won both the Harare Basketball League and National League titles for three straight seasons from 2004 to 2006.

National team career
Tumbare captained both Mashonaland and Zimbabwean men's national basketball teams between the years 2003-2009.

References

External links
Profile at Afrobasket.com

1978 births
Living people
Sportspeople from Harare
Zimbabwean men's basketball players